Kenkere  is a small town in the southern state of Karnataka, India. It is located in the Chiknayakanhalli taluk of Tumkur district in Karnataka. It is the headquarters of the Village Panchayat.

Demographics
As of 2001 India census, kenkere had a population of 5239 with males 2653 and females 2586. 
Coconut is the crop which is main income of farmers here.

Notable people
 K. B. Siddaiah - professor, activist and poet in Kannada, was born in the village.

See also
 Tumkur
 Districts of Karnataka
 Huliyar
 Chikkanayakanahalli

References

External links
 http://Tumkur.nic.in/

Villages in Tumkur district
Hindu temples in Tumkur district
Tourist attractions in Karnataka
Lingayatism
Cities and towns in Tumkur district